Dariusz Marcinkowski (born 11 January 1975, in Środa Wielkopolska) is a Polish former field hockey player who competed in the 2000 Summer Olympics.

References

External links

1975 births
Living people
Polish male field hockey players
Olympic field hockey players of Poland
Field hockey players at the 2000 Summer Olympics
People from Środa Wielkopolska
Sportspeople from Greater Poland Voivodeship